Samsung Galaxy A9 refers to three Samsung Galaxy Android smartphones released in the 2010s.

These are:
Samsung Galaxy A9 (2016), Android smartphone released in 2015.
Samsung Galaxy A9 Pro (2016), Android smartphone release in 2016.
Samsung Galaxy A9 (2018), Android smartphone released in 2018.
Samsung Galaxy A9 Star, the A8 Star's name in China.